Arrested Development is an American television sitcom that aired for three seasons on the Fox network from November 2, 2003 to February 10, 2006, and began streaming a fourth season on Netflix on May 26, 2013.  The show centers on the Bluth family, a formerly wealthy, habitually dysfunctional family, and is presented in a continuous format, incorporating hand-held camera work, narration, archival photos, and historical footage.

Since its debut, the series has earned widespread critical acclaim and has been nominated for a variety of different awards. Arrested Development has received nominations for twenty-five Primetime Emmy Awards (six wins for the series, including Outstanding Comedy Series in 2004), eight TCA Awards (three wins), four Golden Globe Awards (one win), three Writers Guild of America Awards (one win), five Screen Actors Guild Awards, three Producers Guild of America Awards, among other awards.

Lead actor Jason Bateman has been nominated for ten individual awards for his role as Michael Bluth, the President of the Bluth Company, winning the Golden Globe Award for Best Actor in a Comedy Series and two Satellite Awards for Best Actor in a Comedy Series.  Series creator Mitchell Hurwitz won three Primetime Emmy Awards from six nominations for his role as a writer and producer of the series. Arrested Development has been nominated for 82 awards and has won 30.

Emmy Awards
Awarded since 1949, the Primetime Emmy Award is an annual accolade bestowed by members of the Academy of Television Arts & Sciences recognizing outstanding achievements in American prime time television programming.  Awards presented for more technical and production-based categories (like art direction, casting, and editing) are designated "Creative Arts Emmy Awards."  Arrested Development has been nominated for a total of twenty-two awards and won six.

Primetime Emmy Awards

 Barbie Feldman Adler, Brian Grazer, Ron Howard, Victor Hsu, Mitchell Hurwitz, John Levenstein, Chuck Martin, David Nevins, Richard Rosenstock

 Barbie Adler, John Amodeo, Brad Copeland, Brian Grazer, Ron Howard, Mitchell Hurwitz, Chuck Martin, David Nevins, Richard Rosenstock, Jim Vallely

 John Amodeo, Richard Day, Brian Grazer, Ron Howard, Mitchell Hurwitz, Dean Lorey, David Nevins, Tom Saunders, Chuck Tatham, Jim Vallely, Ron Weiner

Primetime Creative Arts Emmy Awards

Golden Globe Awards

The Golden Globe Award is an annual accolade bestowed by members of the Hollywood Foreign Press Association recognizing outstanding achievements in film and television.  Arrested Development has been nominated for four awards and won one.

Producers Guild of America Awards
The Producers Guild of America Award is an annual accolade bestowed by the Producers Guild of America in recognition of outstanding achievements in film and television, since 1990.  Arrested Development has been nominated for three awards.

Satellite Awards
The Satellite Award is an annual accolade bestowed by members of the International Press Academy recognizing outstanding achievements in film and television.  Arrested Development has been nominated for eleven awards and won six.

Screen Actors Guild Awards
Awarded since 1995, the Screen Actors Guild Award is an annual accolade bestowed by members of the Screen Actors Guild recognizing outstanding achievements in acting in television.  Arrested Development has been nominated for five awards.

Television Critics Association Awards
The TCA Award is an annual accolade bestowed by the Television Critics Association in recognition of outstanding achievements in television.  Arrested Development has been nominated for eight awards and won three.

Writers Guild of America Awards
The Writers Guild of America Award is an annual accolade bestowed by the Writers Guild of America in recognition of outstanding achievements in film, television, and radio, since 1949.  Arrested Development has been nominated for three awards and won one.

 Barbie Adler, Brad Copeland, Richard Day, Karey Dornetto, Jake Farrow, Abraham Higginbotham, Mitchell Hurwitz, Sam Laybourne, John Levenstein, Courtney Lilly, Dean Lorey, Chuck Martin, Lisa Parsons, Richard Rosenstock, Tom Saunders, Maria Semple, Chuck Tatham, Jim Vallely, Ron Weiner

 Richard Day, Karey Dornetto, Jake Farrow, Mitchell Hurwitz, Sam Laybourne, Dean Lorey, Tom Saunders, Maria Semple, Chuck Tatham, Jim Vallely, Ron Weiner

Other awards

References

External links
 List of Primetime Emmy Awards received by Arrested Development
 List of awards and nominations received by Arrested Development at IMDb

Awards
Arrested Development